Spas-Kupalishche is a rural locality (a selo) in Lavrovskoye Rural Settlement, Sudogodsky District, Vladimir Oblast, Russia. The population was 34 as of 2010.

Geography 
Spas-Kupalishche is located on the right bank of the Klyazma River, 31 km north of Sudogda (the district's administrative centre) by road. Danilovka is the nearest rural locality.

References 

Rural localities in Sudogodsky District